Lee E. Tafanelli (born March 3, 1961) is an American National Guardsman who, serving as the Adjutant General of Kansas from 2011 to 2020. He is a former Republican member of the Kansas House of Representatives, representing the 47th district.

Career

Politics
Tafanelli was a Republican member of the Kansas House of Representatives, representing the 47th district. He first served from 2001–04.  Following a yearlong deployment in 2005 in support of Operation Iraqi Freedom, he served from 2006 until his resignation January 10, 2011 when he was appointed Adjutant General of Kansas by Governor Sam Brownback.

Committee membership
 Transportation and Public Safety Budget (Chair)
 Appropriations
 Vision 2020
 Veterans, Military and Homeland Security
 Joint Committee on Kansas Security

Major donors
The top 5 donors to Tafanelli's 2008 campaign:
1. Tafanelli, Lee 	$1,750
2. Koch Industries 	$1,000
3. Kansas Medical Society 	$1000 	
4. Kansas Contractors Association 	$1000
5. Wal-Mart 	$900

Military
On January 28, 2011, Tafanelli was sworn in as the Adjutant General of Kansas, the military commander of the Kansas National Guard, and was promoted to major general. Previously he served as assistant adjutant general-Army, Kansas Army National Guard.

Tafanelli joined the Kansas Army National Guard in 1980 and receiving his commission as a second lieutenant in the Corps of Engineers through Army ROTC at Pittsburg State University in 1982.

While serving as commander of the 891st Engineer Battalion, he led the battalion on its deployment to Iraq for Operation Iraqi Freedom in 2005. Later, he commanded the 69th Troop Command and was director of operations for the Kansas National Guard.

Tafanelli has served at the Department of the Army level, as military assistant to the Assistant Secretary of the Army (Manpower and Reserve Affairs) in support of Operation Noble Eagle and Operation Enduring Freedom.

References

External links

 Kansas Legislature - Lee Tafanelli
 Project Vote Smart profile
 Kansas Votes profile
 State Surge – Legislative and voting track record
 Follow the Money campaign contributions:
 2000, 2002, 2004, 2006, 2008

1961 births
Living people
State cabinet secretaries of Kansas
Republican Party members of the Kansas House of Representatives
United States Army generals
National Guard (United States) generals
21st-century American politicians